Central Gardens is an unincorporated community and census-designated place (CDP) in Jefferson County, Texas, United States. The population was 4,373 at the 2020 census. It is part of the Beaumont–Port Arthur metropolitan area.

Geography
Central Gardens is located in eastern Jefferson County at  (29.987946, -94.017507). It is bordered to the southeast by Nederland. Texas State Highway 347 passes through the northeast side of the community, leading southeast into Nederland and northwest  to Beaumont.

Demographics

As of the 2020 United States census, there were 4,373 people, 1,651 households, and 1,066 families residing in the CDP.

As of the census of 2000, there were 4,106 people, 1,563 households, and 1,170 families residing in the CDP. The population density was 1,610.9 people per square mile (621.7/km2). There were 1,701 housing units at an average density of 667.3/sq mi (257.6/km2). The racial makeup of the CDP was 96.08% White, 0.56% African American, 0.29% Native American, 0.49% Asian, 0.02% Pacific Islander, 1.24% from other races, and 1.32% from two or more races. Hispanic or Latino of any race were 4.31% of the population.

There were 1,563 households, out of which 36.3% had children under the age of 18 living with them, 62.3% were married couples living together, 9.5% had a female householder with no husband present, and 25.1% were non-families. 21.3% of all households were made up of individuals, and 9.3% had someone living alone who was 65 years of age or older. The average household size was 2.61 and the average family size was 3.04.

In the CDP, the population was spread out, with 25.7% under the age of 18, 8.4% from 18 to 24, 29.1% from 25 to 44, 25.1% from 45 to 64, and 11.8% who were 65 years of age or older. The median age was 38 years. For every 100 females, there were 101.1 males. For every 100 females age 18 and over, there were 97.5 males.

The median income for a household in the CDP was $49,773, and the median income for a family was $60,096. Males had a median income of $39,500 versus $29,375 for females. The per capita income for the CDP was $24,513. About 3.9% of families and 6.1% of the population were below the poverty line, including 4.8% of those under age 18 and 6.1% of those age 65 or over.

Education
Central Gardens is served by the Nederland Independent School District.

Climate
The climate in this area is characterized by hot, humid summers and generally mild to cool winters.  According to the Köppen Climate Classification system, Central Gardens has a humid subtropical climate, abbreviated "Cfa" on climate maps.

References

Census-designated places in Jefferson County, Texas
Census-designated places in Texas
Unincorporated communities in Jefferson County, Texas
Unincorporated communities in Texas
Beaumont–Port Arthur metropolitan area